Grosspool Music is a recording and artist services label (production, music marketing, management & distribution) based in Nairobi. As a label they have handled releases by Needah, Lion Boy and Teezeh. Grosspool supports affiliated musicians too. The company also offers label services to independent artists and labels.

History
Grosspool was founded in 2013  by Phillip Nyalenda. Initially it was an online service to connect artists, producers, managers and other professionals but later due to market dynamics, the business model changed, Grosspool becoming an agency that worked with individual artists on promotion, management and marketing deals. Teezeh was the first to be signed in late 2014.The brand's slogan is "Stay Resilient"
.

Artists

Needah 
Teezeh

Releases
Grosspool has worked with various artists for talent management and project releases.
Transmission (EP) by Teezeh
Nikiwa Nawe (single) by Teezeh
Safari Mixtape (LP) by Needah 
Cheque In Ma Hand (single) by Needah
Street Love (single) by Lion Boy feat. LB
Light Up (single) by Videz, Teezeh, Kash & Nasha Dee
Rembo (Single) by Permi featuring permi Boi

Awards

Best Hip Hop music (2013 Vybez Awards)	K- Town(single)	Needah	>>Won
Best Female Artist (2014 Vybez Awards)	-	Needah	>>Won
Best Hip Hop Song (2015 Vybez Awards)	Drizzling Sorrow(single)	Needah	>>Won

Needah has bagged other nominations too.

References

External links 
Grosspool Site
Grosspool on Soundcloud

Talent agencies
Companies based in Nairobi
Entertainment companies established in 2014